The Indice de Precio Selectivo de Acciones (S&P/CLX IPSA) is a Chilean stock market index composed of the 30 stocks with the highest average annual trading volume in the Santiago Stock Exchange. On the last trading day of the year, the index is re-based back to 1000. The index has been calculated since 1977 and is revised on a quarterly basis.

Composition
IPSA's component companies  are:

References

External links
Bloomberg page for IPSA
IPSA at Santiago Stock Exchange site

South American stock market indices